Acacia perpusilla, commonly known as the King Edward River wattle, is a shrub of the genus Acacia and the subgenus Plurinerves that is endemic to a small area of north western Australia.

Description
Like most species of Acacia it has phyllodes rather than true leaves. The evergreen phyllodes are ascending to erect with a widely obovate shape and are dimidiate with a rounded upper margin and a straight lower margin.

Distribution
It is native to a small area in the Kimberley region of Western Australia.

See also
List of Acacia species

References

perpusilla
Acacias of Western Australia
Taxa named by Russell Lindsay Barrett
Taxa named by Bruce Maslin
Taxa named by Matthew David Barrett